10th SLGFCA Awards
December 20, 2015

Best Film: 
Spotlight

Best Director: 
Tom McCarthySpotlight
The nominees for the 12th St. Louis Film Critics Association Awards were announced on December 13, 2015.

Winners, runners-up and nominees

Best Film
 Spotlight
 Runner-up: Inside Out
 Mad Max: Fury Road
 The Revenant
 Room

Best Actor
 Leonardo DiCaprio – The Revenant
 Runner-up: Ian McKellen – Mr. Holmes
 Abraham Attah – Beasts of No Nation
 Matt Damon – The Martian
 Eddie Redmayne – The Danish Girl

Best Supporting Actor
 Sylvester Stallone – Creed
 Runner-up: Mark Rylance – Bridge of Spies
 Paul Dano – Love & Mercy
 Idris Elba – Beasts of No Nation
 Mark Ruffalo – Spotlight

Best Original Screenplay
 Spotlight – Tom McCarthy and Josh Singer Runner-up: Ex Machina – Alex Garland Clouds of Sils Maria – Olivier Assayas
 The Hateful Eight – Quentin Tarantino
 Inside Out – Pete Docter, Meg LeFauve, and Josh Cooley

Best Cinematography
 The Revenant – Emmanuel Lubezki Runner-up: Carol – Edward Lachman Beasts of No Nation – Cary Fukunaga
 The Hateful Eight – Robert Richardson
 Mad Max: Fury Road – John Seale

Best Editing
 Mad Max: Fury Road – Margaret Sixel Runner-up: The Revenant – Stephen Mirrione The Big Short – Hank Corwin
 The Martian – Pietro Scalia
 Spotlight – Tom McArdle

Best Music
 Ennio Morricone – The Hateful Eight
 Runner-up: Michael Giacchino – Inside Out
 Carter Burwell – Carol 
 Disasterpeace – It Follows
 Junkie XL – Mad Max: Fury Road

Best Art Direction
 Mad Max: Fury Road
 Runner-up (tie): Brooklyn, Carol, and The Danish Girl
 Cinderella

Best Foreign Language Film
 Goodnight Mommy • Austria Runner-up Son of Saul • Hungary The Assassin • Taiwan
 Phoenix • Germany
 Wild Tales • Argentina

Best Animated Feature
 Inside Out
 Runner-up: Anomalisa
 The Good Dinosaur
 The Peanuts Movie
 Shaun the Sheep Movie

Best Scene
(favorite movie scene or sequence)
 The Revenant: Hugh mauled by a grizzly Runner-up: The Walk: The walk between the Twin Towers Creed: Creed’s first fight.
 Furious 7: The farewell scene between Vin Diesel and Paul Walker.
 Room: Jack’s escape and rescue.

Best Director
 Tom McCarthy – Spotlight
 Runner-up: George Miller – Mad Max: Fury Road
 Todd Haynes – Carol
 Alejandro G. Iñárritu – The Revenant
 Ridley Scott – The Martian

Best Actress
 Brie Larson – Room
 Runner-up: Saoirse Ronan – Brooklyn
 Cate Blanchett – Carol
 Charlize Theron – Mad Max: Fury Road
 Alicia Vikander – The Danish Girl

Best Supporting Actress
 Alicia Vikander – Ex Machina
 Runner-up (tie): Kristen Stewart – Clouds of Sils Maria and Rooney Mara – Carol
 Jennifer Jason Leigh – The Hateful Eight
 Kate Winslet – Steve Jobs

Best Adapted Screenplay
 The Martian – Drew Goddard Runner-up: Brooklyn – Nick Hornby Creed – Ryan Coogler and Aaron Covington
 Room – Emma Donoghue
 Steve Jobs – Aaron Sorkin

Best Visual Effects
 Mad Max: Fury Road
 Runner-up: The Walk
 Ex Machina
 The Martian
 The Revenant

Best Song
 "Writing's on the Wall" – Spectre
 Runner-up: "See You Again" – Furious 7
 "Feels Like Summer" – Shaun the Sheep Movie
 "Til It Happens to You" – The Hunting Ground
 "Simple Song #3" – Youth

Best Soundtrack
 Love & Mercy
 Runner-up: Straight Outta Compton
 Amy
 Dope
 The Martian

Best Documentary Film
 Amy
 Runner-up: The Look of Silence
 Best of Enemies
 Cartel Land
 The Hunting Ground

Best Comedy
 Trainwreck
 Runner-up: Me and Earl and the Dying Girl
Inside Out
Spy
What We Do in the Shadows

Worst Film
 Fantastic Four
 Runner-up: Aloha
 The Boy Next Door
 Jem and the Holograms
 Jupiter Ascending
 Mortdecai
 Paul Blart: Mall Cop 2
 The Ridiculous 6
 Stonewall
 Strange Magic

SPECIAL RECOGNITION: The stunt work on Mad Max: Fury Road.

References

External links
 Official website

2015
2015 film awards
2015 in Missouri
St Louis